John Reardon is a former banker who evacuated 105 persons in Saigon towards the end of the Vietnam War, all of whom were co-workers and dependents from his employment at a local bank in the city. During the evacuation, he claimed that all of the persons were either his wives, sons, or daughters.

References

Saint Joseph's College (Indiana) alumni